Ciechanowice  is a village (former mining town) in the administrative district of Gmina Marciszów, within Kamienna Góra County, Lower Silesian Voivodeship, in south-western Poland.

The village has a population of 1,100.

References

Villages in Kamienna Góra County
Former populated places in Lower Silesian Voivodeship